This is a list of palaces and mansions in Budapest in Hungary.

List of palaces and mansions in Budapest

See also
 List of palaces and mansions in Hungary
 List of castles in Hungary

References

Budapest
Houses in Hungary